York Terrace overlooks the south side of Regent's Park in Marylebone, City of Westminster, London, England. York Terrace West is a Grade I listed building. York Terrace East contains Grade II listed buildings. 1–18 York Terrace East is listed at Grade I.

History
It consists of two separate Regency style terraced buildings, York Terrace East and York Terrace West, which are joined by York Gate (built 1813) which frames St Marylebone Parish Church. York Terrace is one of the park's principal buildings.

As with Cornwall Terrace and Clarence Terrace, York Terrace was constructed by the company of James Burton, to a design by John Nash and Decimus Burton.

There are two blue plaques on York Terrace East, at the Doric Villa at Nos. 19 and 20, for the psychoanalyst Ernest Jones and the actor-manager Sir Charles Wyndham respectively.

References

Decimus Burton buildings
Houses in the City of Westminster
James Burton (property developer) buildings
John Nash buildings
Regency architecture in London
Regent's Park